Erik Prekop (born 8 October 1997) is a Slovak football forward who currently plays for Bohemians 1905. He was previously loaned to lower division teams.

Club career

AS Trenčín
Prekop made his professional Fortuna Liga debut for AS Trenčín against Zemplín Michalovce on 16 July 2016. Trenčín lost the away game 2:1. Prekop came on in the 65th minute, replacing Denis Jančo.

International career
In December 2022, Prekop was first recognised in a Slovak senior national team nomination and was immediately shortlisted by Francesco Calzona for prospective players' training camp at NTC Senec.

References

External links
 AS Trenčín official club profile
 Fortuna Liga profile
 
 Eurofotbal profile
 Futbalnet profile

1997 births
Living people
Sportspeople from Trenčín
Slovak footballers
Slovak expatriate footballers
Association football forwards
AS Trenčín players
FK Inter Bratislava players
FC Petržalka players
FC Hradec Králové players
Bohemians 1905 players
Slovak Super Liga players
Czech First League players
Expatriate footballers in the Czech Republic
Slovak expatriate sportspeople in the Czech Republic